Tjeerd-Pieter David Oosterhuis (born 25 December 1971), also known as TJ Oosterhuis, is a Dutch musician, songwriter and producer known internationally for his chart topping work with Madcon, Kelly Rowland and Estelle. His production of Freaky Like Me for Madcon was a number 1 hit Norway. It went four times platinum there and received a gold certification in Germany.

He is the son of writer, theologian and former priest Huub Oosterhuis. With his younger sister and singer Trijntje Oosterhuis, Tjeerd formed the mid-1990s band Total Touch.

After Total Touch disbanded in 1997 Oosterhuis founded a music production company, DEMP, and produced the album Face to Face for his wife, Edsilia Rombley, and a solo album for his sister Trijntje. He has also worked with many other artists including Candy Dulfer, Mathilde Santing, K-otic, Gordon, Re-play, Di-rect, Alain Clark, Julian Thomas, Petra Berger, Hind, Henny Vrienten and Karin Bloemen. A recent venture is the supergroup Ladies of Soul that premiered in 2014 for annual arena-shows in both the Netherlands and Belgium. It is formed around four famous Dutch singers: his sister Trijntje Oosterhuis (2014-2017),his wife Edsilia Rombley, Glennis Grace and Berget Lewis, plus saxophone-player and singer Candy Dulfer.

He has made music for various commercials, movies and television programmes. By June 2022, he started releasing neo-classical piano music though the Andante Piano label under his own name.

Early life
Oosterhuis was born and raised in Amsterdam, The Netherlands in a family of creative professionals. His mother Jozefien Melief is a classical violin player. His father Huub Oosterhuis, a former priest, is a theologian, poet and church music lyricist. At a very early age Oosterhuis discovers the piano and from age seven he receives formal piano lessons, being classically trained at first. He is challenged regularly to make compositions to his father's newly written lyrics thus learning to create melodies still being in his teens.
His younger sister Trijntje Oosterhuis develops herself as a saxophone player and singer. Together they start making popular music from their early formative years.

Career

1990s
Tjeerd is the main composer and producer of the band, as well as being the bandleader and keyboard player.
Total Touch is offered a record deal in 1995 and their debut album Total Touch is released in 1997. It features a mixture of pop, soul, R&B and funk. The first single "Touch Me There" becomes a summer hit and goes platinum, selling over 100,000 copies in its first month. With eventual sales of over 500,000 copies, the album becomes one of the most successful ever debuts in Dutch musical history.

The next album This Way is their first number-one in the charts and grows equally successful, although the album is not well known internationally. Both albums and several singles are resulting in a total sales of over 1,000,000 copies combined.

After a short hiatus Tjeerd and Trijntje decide to go their separate ways. Trijntje went on to develop herself as a solo singer, singing both in Dutch as in English. Tjeerd is starting to focus more on his abilities as a songwriter, arranger and producer.

By 1997 Tjeerd Oosterhuis has already started his own studio and production company DEMP Music in Amsterdam as well as a publishing company called DEMP Songs. Next to his work as a composer, he starts producing external artists. Due to his succes with Total Touch, many artists find their way to his studio's. Next to working with his sister Trijntje he does productions with and for Dutch artists like Edsilia Rombley, Candy Dulfer, Mathilde Santing, Gordon, Romeo, Re-Play, Di-rect, Hind, Henny Vrienten and Karin Bloemen. Oosterhuis also collaborates with several international composers and lyricists like Keith John (Stevie Wonder), Terry Cox en Marjorie Maye.

2000s
In 2001, Oosterhuis is the musical director of the TV-show Starmaker. He then starts working with the Dutch act K-otic who took part in that show, producing and mixing part of their multi-platinum debut album.
At DEMP Studio's Oosterhuis also starts making music for various radio- and TV-commercials, Renault, Coca-Cola and Radio 538 being some of his clients. He contributes to the soundtrack of the movie , supplying the hit-titlesong "", being sung by Trijntje.
DEMP is also the birthplace of various other projects. For TV-show Big Brother, composing the leader music, a summer hit "" by singer Leona Philippo and the popular single "" by Gordon & Re-Play. Plus music for the SBS 6 TV-series Luifel en Luifel, All You Need Is Love, Sterrenbeurs, NSE en 80's/90's quiz (Talpa), all being DEMP productions.

In 2002 Oosterhuis writes and produces the album Face To Face for singer Edsilia Rombley plus the major part of his sister's solo-studiodebut, the untitled 2003 album from Trijntje Oosterhuis. Tracks for Romeo & Gordon are written of which "" is a chart hit. Songs are written with an for Alain Clark, Di-rect, Re-Play, Popstars and Julian Thomas. He signs a three-year publishing contract with Tony Berk (Tee Jack Music Publishing) and is a juror for the TV-show  (2004) that focuses of finding new talent for theatre.
2005 starts with writing and producing "" under the name  to benefit the victims of the 2004 Indian Ocean earthquake and tsunami. He founds New Amsterdam Music, a pool for writers to develop new talent. Songs are written for GIO, Hind, Petra Berger plus for the upcoming the Dutch language album of Edsilia Rombley. There is lots of work for TV.
He is musical director for the theatre tour of Edsilia Rombley and is asked create a modern version of the Mozart opera Cosi Fan Tutte by Opera Cinema Nederland. He wins the NiX-Factor award for the tune "So What Dan NiX!!" by Pimp Paulusma ft. Giomama.

2006 sees succes with the debut single on DEMP Records, "" Danny and Guillermo. It turns out to be the big Dutch summer hit of that year. Leaders are being made for 80's/90's Quiz, Entertainment Live, Top Koks and there is lots of pre-production work for upcoming albums by Petra Berger and Edsilia Rombley.

In 2007, the first Dutch-language album  by Edsilia Rombley is finally issued, largely being a DEMP production. Songs are written for Herman van Veen, Hansen Tomas, FF, Rodrigo, Touchin' Tongues, Jim Bakkum and Pedro Madera. Oosterhuis writes and produces the songs "" and "On Top of the World" for Edsilia Rombey to participate in the Eurovision Song Contest 2007. He also finishes an adaptation of the Astrid Lindgren musical De Gebroeders Leeuwenhart, composing all of the music for the Dutch audience.

New music is made for Hind, Belgium X-Factor winner Udo and the popular single " for Dutch artist Lieke van Lexmond. Development work is done for Dutch singer-songwriter duo Bloom is done, production for Alderliefste plus the final touch is made to the debut DVD album Stukken voor Stukken by Mike & Thomas, based on their popular TV-show.

By 2009 there are productions for Ralf Mackenbach, Jeroen van der Boom, Rachel Kramer, Sarah Kruez, Ameerah, Lisa, Amy & Shelley and Antje Monteiro. Oosterhuis composes and produces all music for the TV-show S1NGLE, broadcast by Net5, including the title tune "" sung by Trijntje Oosterhuis. For the movie  he produces the song "", sung by Lisa, Amy & Shelley.

2010s
2010 sees productions for Wesley Klein, Senna & Anna, Gerard Joling, X-Factor candidate Maaike Vos and Edsilia Rombley. Besides he composes all music for the musical , the first time a project like that is done in The Netherlands. There's succes with the Norwegian duo Madcon. The Oosterhuis co-written and co-produced single "Freaky Like Me" (feat. Ameerah) gets gold status in the German and Austrian pop charts. In their homeland Norway it reaches the top of the charts and ends up selling four times platinum.

He also composes the song "One Thousand Voices" for the popular TV-show The Voice Of Holland broadcast by RTL 4. It is sung live at the shows by all coaches thus becoming the title song for that season and reaches the top of the Dutch pop-charts in two weeks.

The track "Say Yes" is a production for the Japanese boyband W-inds. His production of "Victory", by Dutch rap-artist Brainpower, is being used for the soundtrack of the American movie Thunderstruck. His sister Trijntje Oosterhuis is asked as a coach on The Voice Of Holland and Tjeerd serves as her co-producer and counselor. When candidate Sandra van Nieuwland leaves the show after the semi-finals she releases, within a week, her debut album And More. It is produced by Oosterhuis and becomes a chart hit ending up a being the second best selling album in The Netherlands that year. Various of her singles also end up high in the Dutch charts.

2013 sees charts succes for another Madcon production in collaboration with Kelly Rowland (Destiny's Child). The single "One Life" from Madcon ft. Kelly Rowland reaches gold in Germany and double platinum in Norway. The subsequent album Icon also features the Oosterhuis production "Where Nobody's Gone Before" with British singer Estelle. DEMP Music releases the album Sweet Soul Music by Edsilia Rombley, a collaboration with the Dutch Metropole Orchestra. Oosterhuis serves as one of the producers for the AVRO TV-format Join The Beat where viewers can submit their contributions to a pre-created beat by Sven Figee. The best parts are being used to create a track at the end of the show. Late November "I'll Carry You" is released, a new tune by Ladies Of Soul as a teaser for the upcoming concerts. Oosterhuis is again involved with The Voice Of Holland where his sister Trijntje Oosterhuis serves as coach for a second time.

After years of preparation the first Ladies Of Soul shows take place in February 2014. There are productions for Mylène and Rosanne ("Me & My Selfie") and Keet! ("Grijp Je Kans"). DEMP Music releases "The Piano Ballads - Volume 1" by Edsilia Rombley. A new single "Up Till Now" by Ladies Of Soul announces a newly string of concerts in 2015.
The compositions have been made over many years and are now brought in a modern setting sung by a range of popular Dutch singers. They are Trijntje Oosterhuis, Edsilia Rombley, Jan Dulles (3JS), Paul de Leeuw, Huub van der Lubbe, Tania Kross, Youp van 't Hek and Berget Lewis. That fall there is the TV-special  featuring interviews and performances of the songs in collaboration with the Metropole Orchestra. Oosterhuis starts working with Dutch singer Steffen Morrison releasing a first single "Do It All Again". The third single "Feel Good" from Ladies Of Soul announces their new shows for 2016.

In 2016 to 2018 there are several compositions and productions for Dutch soulsinger Steffen Morrison, Edsilia Rombley, both with albumreleases on DEMP Music. Oosterhuis serves as musical director and co-producer for Whitney - A Tribute By Glennis Grace (Live In Concert), both for the live shows as the subsequent CD and DVD releases. In 2019 production starts on an album for Steffen Morrison.

2020s
2020 sees the release of Soul Revolution, an album production for Steffen Morrison, his second on the DEMP Music label. That year also new single productions are done with Edsilia Rombley. Plus a live album recorded at the Dutch .
In 2021 there are several single productions for Edsilia Rombley including a duet with Dutch singer Numidia. An album of Christmas duets by Rombley is released later that year on DEMP. Also production is done for G.R.O.E.N., a Dutch formation that focuses on the issues of battling climate change. This year Oosterhuis also focuses on further developing and recording his own piano music.
In 2022 there's "Hoelang Nog?", a duet single by Edsilia Rombley & Berget Lewis. By June 2022, Tjeerd Oosterhuis has started releasing neo-classical piano music for the Andante Piano label under his own name.

Ladies Of Soul
The fall of 2013 a single "I'll Carry You" is released by Ladies Of Soul as a teaser for the upcoming concert performances. In February 2014, after years of preparation, the first Ladies Of Soul shows premiere. The project is initiated and produced by Oosterhuis and features a supergroup of Dutch singers. They are Trijntje Oosterhuis (2014–2016), Berget Lewis, Edsilia Rombley, Glennis Grace plus saxophone player/singer Candy Dulfer. The show celebrates existing American soul, R&B and funk but also features several original compositions. It also features local guest singers like Shirma Rouse, Brown Hill, Leona Philippo and Ricardo Burgrust. There are two shows at the Amsterdam Ziggo Dome. In April, a live registration is released on both CD as DVD and the show is broadcast several times by RTL 4. Late 2014 there's a second single "Up Till Now" that announces new shows for the next year. In 2015 there are three shows at the same venue and one in Belgium at "Lotto Arena" in Antwerp. It is a new production, this time featuring several special guests like Re-Play, Flemish singer Natalia plus American singer/percussionist Sheila E. Also guesting is Keith John, back-up singer for Stevie Wonder since 1985. A third single Feel Good, late 2015, serves as an introduction for the 2016 shows. Yet another new production is presented in February that year, this time also featuring Shirma Rouse, Rolf Sanchez plus international guests Chance Howard, Keith John and Billy Ocean. For the 2017 edition Trijntje Oosterhuis has formally left the official line-up to focus on her solo career. But she does still feature as a guest artist. Other guests include the Dutch Zo Gospel Choir, Alain Clark plus international artists Leonardo Amuedo, Frank McComb and Oleta Adams. The 2018 edition again features Trijntje Oosterhuis as guest, next to Leona Philippo, Kimberly Maasdamme, Gianna Tam, Ivan Peroti plus international artists Chance Howard and J.T. Taylor, longtime leadsinger of Kool & The Gang. In 2019 there is another brand new Ladies Of Soul project that co-features Leona Philippo, Steffen Morrison, Shirma Rouse, Ronnie Flex, Zo Gospel Choir with Brandon Delagraentiss and international guests Chance Howard and En Vogue. All shows have been made available as live registrations both on CD and DVD and been broadcast several times on Dutch TV.

Kinderen voor Kinderen
Oosterhuis produced the album , which lasted in the national charts for 19 weeks, meaning a major revival for the choir. The Oosterhuis produced album  reaches the top of the national Dutch charts which last happened in 1983 and ends up selling diamond status. Subsequent albums from 2013 to 2021, like ,  and  all reach gold or platinum status and end up in the top 10 as best selling album each year. Several of his productions also end up on the 2-CD compilation  showcasing the favourites of the last 35 years. By 2021, Oosterhuis announces that  will be his last production for the Kinderen Voor Kinderen project.

References

External links
 
 DEMP Entertainment official website
 

1971 births
Living people
Dutch record producers
Dutch songwriters
Dutch Roman Catholics
Musicians from Amsterdam